James Obede "Hot Ice" Toney (born 5 August 1980) is a Ghanaian professional boxer who competed from 2000 to 2010. He held the African middleweight title, World Boxing Council (WBC) International middleweight title, and Commonwealth middleweight title. He also challenged for the World Boxing Council (WBC) International middleweight title against Sergey Tatevosyan, and North American Boxing Federation (NABF) super middleweight title, North American Boxing Association (NABA) super middleweight title, and World Boxing Council (WBC) Continental Americas super middleweight title, against Lucian Bute. His professional fighting weight varied from middleweight to cruiserweight.

References

External links

1980 births
Living people
African Boxing Union champions
Heavyweight boxers
Light-heavyweight boxers
Middleweight boxers
Boxers from Accra
Super-middleweight boxers
Ghanaian male boxers